The Headless Bust: A Melancholy Meditation on the False Millennium is an illustrated book by American author/illustrator Edward Gorey, and is a sequel to his The Haunted Tea Cozy dedicated to the memory of Lancelot Brown. The story features the Bahhumbug throughout its 30 illustrated panels colored in black, white, brown, yellow and light blue. In rhyming verse it explores the baffling human condition, leaving the characters as well as the reader with more questions than answers.

References 

1999 books
Books by Edward Gorey